The 2003 BCR Open Romania was a men's tennis tournament played on outdoor clay courts at the Arenele BNR in Bucharest in Romania and was part of the International Series of the 2003 ATP Tour. The tournament ran from 8 September through 14 September 2003. Fourth-seeded David Sánchez won the singles title.

Finals

Singles

 David Sánchez defeated  Nicolás Massú 6–2, 6–2
 It was Sánchez's 2nd title of the year and the 2nd of his career.

Doubles

 Karsten Braasch /  Sargis Sargsian defeated  Simon Aspelin /  Jeff Coetzee 7–6(9–7), 6–2
 It was Braasch's only title of the year and the 6th of his career. It was Sargsian's 2nd title of the year and the 3rd of his career.

References

External links
 Official website 
 ATP tournament profile

BCR Open Romania
Romanian Open
BCR Open Romania
BCR Open Romania